Harriet's Magic Hats was a Canadian television series created by ACCESS TV which aired in Alberta on ACCESS TV from 1980–1986.

The premise of the show was that an aunt named Harriet has a trunk full of magic hats in her attic. When her young niece wears a hat from the trunk she is transported to a place related to the hat. For example, if she wore a chef's hat from the trunk, the girl was transported to a kitchen with professional chefs, where she would learn about the profession. The show was 15 minutes long, and gave children a diverse view of the working world.

Cast

Lynne Thornton as Aunt Harriet
Sharon Holownia as Susan
Frank C. Turner as Ralph the Parrot (Seasons 1–2)
Ronnie Burkett as Ralph the Parrot (Seasons 3–4)
Sarah C.R. Makins as Mandy (Season 1)
Jessica Owen as Jessie (Season 2)
Carrie Cheverie as Carrie (Season 4)

Writers 
Episodes 1 - 26: Donaleen Saul

Episodes 27 - 52: Bob Swift-Hill

References

External links
Harriet's Magic Hats @ TV.com
Harriet's Magic Hats

1980s Canadian children's television series
CTV 2 original programming
Canadian television shows featuring puppetry